Angelia Williams Graves is an American politician who has served as a Democratic member for the 90th district in the Virginia House of Delegates since 2021.

Biography
Graves obtained an Associate Degree in Business Administration from Tidewater Community College. She would then go on to obtain a Bachelor's Degree in marketing from Old Dominion University.

Political career

2010
Graves first entered politics in 2010 running for Norfolk City Council's Super Ward 7. Graves would win the election with 40% of the vote. She would be re-elected again in 2012, 2016, and 2020. Graves would also serve as vice-mayor from 2013 to 2016.

2021
On November 19, 2020, Graves announced her plan to run for the 90th district in the Virginia House of Delegates following the resignation of Delegate Joseph C. Lindsey to become a judge in the Norfolk General District Court. Graves would defeat Rick James for the Democratic nomination in a firehouse primary. She would go on and defeat Republican Sylvia Bryant in the special election.

Election history

References

Democratic Party members of the Virginia House of Delegates
Women state legislators in Virginia
Politicians from Norfolk, Virginia
21st-century American politicians
21st-century American women politicians
Living people
Year of birth missing (living people)
Tidewater Community College alumni
Old Dominion University alumni